Thospia tshetverikovi is a species of snout moth in the genus Thospia. It was described by V. I. Kuznetzov in 1908. It was described from the Aral Sea in Kazakhstan and Uzbekistan.

References

Moths described in 1908
Phycitini